Dick Wilson (November 11, 1911 – November 24, 1941) was an American jazz tenor saxophonist, best known for his work with the Andy Kirk big band.

Wilson was born in Mount Vernon, Illinois, raised in Seattle, and went to high school in Los Angeles. He started on piano and learned saxophone in Seattle from saxophonist Joe Darensbourg. He became a member of Darensbourg's band in 1930. In 1936, he joined Andy Kirk's Clouds of Joy. Wilson was a member of Kirk's band until 1941 when he died of tuberculosis in New York City.

With Mary Lou Williams and Pha Terrell, Wilson was one of the most striking musical personalities in the band. He cultivated a style that has been compared to Lester Young's because of similar characteristics in their solos.

References

1941 deaths
American jazz saxophonists
American male saxophonists
1911 births
20th-century American saxophonists
People from Mount Vernon, Illinois
Jazz musicians from Illinois
20th-century American male musicians
American male jazz musicians
20th-century deaths from tuberculosis
Tuberculosis deaths in New York (state)